Aadarsam  is a 1993 Indian Telugu-language drama film, produced by C. Venkataraju, G. Sivaraju under the Sri Vijaya Lakshmi Productions banner and directed by Mouli. It stars Jagapathi Babu, Ashwini Nachappa, Raghu and music composed by M. M. Keeravani. Later dubbed into Tamil as Aananenna Pennenna.

Plot
The film begins at an orphanage where Jyothi a plucky naughty girl defies the rules. One day, Jyothi gets out that she has a family. Suryanarayana, her father an alcoholic, and his benevolent wife Savitri. The couple already has two daughters Lalitha and Vani. Suyarnarayana always subject Savitri to oppression for continuously giving birth to baby girls for which he admitted Jyothi to the asylum. Now Jyothi proceeds toward her father and coercively hangs with him. Subsequently, she takes on household responsibilities and also boosts the courage of her sisters to strive for their goals. Years roll by, and Jyothi toils and molds her sisters. Lalitha becomes well educated and works as a school teacher whereas Vani is a famous local singer. About which Suryanarayana is unbeknownst.

Parallelly, Devi Prasad, an honorable-seeming hoodlum conducts a high level of illegal activities in autos in the town. Chakrapani a good soul holds a stand that benefits Devi Prasad as gratitude. Jyothi acquires an auto from him and they fall for each other. Inspector Shivaji a sheer cop is appointed to desist Devi Prasad who gallantly challenges him. Destiny stands for Shivaji & Chakrapani antagonists. Apart from that, Shivaji is a widower and contains a daughter Veena that is a student of Lalitha. She endears her and also comes closer to Shivaji. Meanwhile, Vani joins a music troupe of Pardhasaradhi, he likes her but Vani's desires are at a height. At a point, Suryanarayana is aware of his daughters' achievements as a result three of them quit the house along with their mother.

Currently, they reside in a colony that is under jeopardy of wretch Prem, son of Devi Prasad. He acts out his crimes under the garb of a cultural club. Despite being deserted by her husband Savitri takes care of him. Knowing it, Suryanarayana realizes and decides to do something good for his family. Meanwhile, Lalitha completes her I.A.S, returns as Collector, and knits Shivaji. Immediately, she shutdowns Prem's club and apprehends him. Soon after release, begrudged Prem traps and hoodwinks Vani. During this plight, Lalitha pleads Prem to nuptial Vani when he conditionally asks and reopens his businesses. However, turn around his word and also affronts the entire family. Here, incensed Jyothi onslaughts on him when to thwart Shivaji takes her into custody. Annoyed Vani attempts suicide when Pardhasaradhi rescues and wholeheartedly accepts her. In jail, Prem manipulates and torments Jyothi but she is safeguarded by reformed Chakrapani. Besides, Savitri is unable to endure the affliction of Prem and moves to kill him but on the verge, Suryanarayana slaughters him. At last, Shivaji, Chakrapani, and Jyothi cease Devi Prasad. Finally, the movie ends with Suryanarayana feeling proud to give birth to such ideal daughters before leaving for prison.

Cast

Jagapathi Babu as Shivaji
Ashwini Nachappa as Jyothi
Raghu as Chakrapani
J. D. Chakravarthy as Prem
Nutan Prasad as Commissioner Prasad
Tanikella Bharani as Suryanarayana
Brahmanandam as Madhu
Jayalalita as Achala Kumari & Kuchala Kumari  (dual role)
Sujatha as Savitri
Saranya as Lalitha
Hema as Chakrapani's sister
Mallikarjuna Rao as Aachary
Ananth as Bilahari
Sakshi Ranga Rao
Raja Ravindra as Pardhasaradhi
Jenny as Minister
Yamuna as Vani
Babu Sunayana as Veena
Gowtham Raju
Bangalore Padma

Soundtrack 

Music composed by M. M. Keeravani. Lyrics written by Bhuvanachandra. Music released on Balaji Audio Company.

References 

Films scored by M. M. Keeravani
1990s Telugu-language films